Dakshin Maynadal is a village in the Panskura CD block in the Tamluk subdivision of the Purba Medinipur district in the state of West Bengal, India.

Geography

Location

Urbanisation
94.08% of the population of Tamluk subdivision live in the rural areas. Only 5.92% of the population live in the urban areas, and that is the second lowest proportion of urban population amongst the four subdivisions in Purba Medinipur district, just above Egra subdivision.

Note: The map alongside presents some of the notable locations in the subdivision. All places marked in the map are linked in the larger full screen map.

Demographics
According to the 2011 Census of India, Dakshin Maynadal had a total population of 1,024, of which 521 (51%) were males and 503 (49%) were females. There were 108 persons in the age range of 0–6 years. The total number of literate persons in Dakshin Maynadal was 712 (77.73% of the population over 6 years).

Culture
The pancharatna Radha Gobinda temple is a 200-year-old structure that has been renovated, as per the renovation tablet in the temple. (see picture of tablet).

Dakshin Maynadal picture gallery

References

External links

Villages in Purba Medinipur district